Karsten Heine (born 6 April 1955) is a German football manager and former player who manages VSG Altglienicke.

Managerial career

Union Berlin
Heine has managed 1. FC Union Berlin on two occasions. The first stint happened from January 1988 to April 1990 and the second stint happened from April 1996 to September 1997.

Hertha BSC and Hertha BSC II
Heine has also managed Hertha BSC and Hertha BSC II. Heine managed Hertha BSC II from July 1990 to August 1992, from January 2004 to April 2007, and from July 2007 to June 2013.

Chemnitzer FC
Chemnitzer FC hired Heine in October 2013. He was sacked on 2 March 2016.

Managerial record

References

1955 births
Living people
German footballers
German football managers
1. FC Union Berlin players
Hertha BSC managers
East German footballers
East German football managers
Footballers from Berlin
1. FC Union Berlin managers
Bundesliga managers
Chemnitzer FC managers
Association football midfielders
3. Liga managers